Diaminobenzene can refer to three different isomers, which are also termed phenylenediamines:

1,2-diaminobenzene
1,3-diaminobenzene
1,4-diaminobenzene